Henry Raby was an American politician. He was a state legislator in Louisiana. He represented Natchitoches Parish from 1872 to 1876. He was documented as being "Colored".

He was a Republican.

References

People from Natchitoches Parish, Louisiana
African-American politicians during the Reconstruction Era
Louisiana Republicans
African-American state legislators in Louisiana
Year of birth missing
Year of death missing